Kompakt: Total 8 or Total 8 was released on 13 August 2007. The album is the eighth installment of the Cologne-based microhouse label's annual compilation of vinyl releases and exclusives from its biggest artists and most promising newcomers. All tracks on the vinyl edition are previously unreleased. As with its predecessor (Total 7), the CD edition includes all tracks from the vinyl edition, and additionally fourteen tracks taken already available 12 inch singles.

Track listing : Vinyl Edition 
A1 Schaeben & Voss feat. Schad Privat – Cold Wind

A2 Justus Köhncke – Pickpockets

B1 Reinhard Voigt – Follow The DJ

B2 Thomas/Mayer – Über Wiesen

C1 Burger/Voigt – Man Lebt Nur Zweimal

C2 Jürgen Paape + Boy Schaufler – We Love

D1 Superpitcher – Rainy Nights In Georgia

D2 Mikkel Metal – Vastion

E  DJ Koze – Mariposa

F  Kaito – Soul Of Heart (Remix)

Track listing : CD Edition 
101. Burger/Voigt – "Man Lebt Nur Zweimal" (6:51)

102. Jürgen Paape & Boy Schaufler – "We Love" (5:40)

103. Superpitcher – "Rainy Nights In Georgia" (6:34)

104. Partial Arts – "Trauermusik" (7:56)

105. Rex The Dog – "Every Day (5:21)

106. Thomas/Mayer – "Über Wiesen" (7:04)

107. Jörg Burger – "Polyform 1" (5:56)

108. SuperMayer  – "Two Of Us (Geiger mix)" (7:10)

109. Steadycam – "In The Moog For Love" (7:39)

110. Nightcats – "Inside" (6:49)

111. The Rice Twins – "Can I Say" (7:30)

201. Hervé Ak – "The Closer" (8:07)

202. DJ Koze – "Mariposa" (7:38)

203. Reinhard Voigt – "Follow The DJ" (5:11)

204. Jürgen Paape – "Nord" (5:59)

205. Echo Club – "Falter" (5:52)

206. April Brikha – "Berghain" (7:09)

207. Gui Boratto – "Mr Decay (Robert Babicz Universum Disco mix)" (7:47)

208. Justus Köhncke – "Pickpockets" (7:04)

209. Broke – "Coladancer" (8:06)

210. Schaeben & Voss – "Cold Wind (feat. Schad Privat)" (5:18)

211. Oxia – "Not Sure" (7:58)

Fourteen tracks on the CD are taken from previously released 12 inch singles originally released on Kompakt or sub-labels (catalogue number in parentheses): #104 (KOM149); #105 (KOM145); #107 (K2/23); #108 (KOM159); #109 (K2/25); #110 (K2/24); #111 (K2/17); #201 (K2/17); #204 (KOM156); #205 (KOM148); #206 (KOM151); #207 (KOM158); #209 (KOMPOP11); #211 (Speicher50).

References

External links 
 

2007 compilation albums
Kompakt compilation albums
Record label compilation albums
Microhouse albums